Juncus kelloggii is a species of rush known by the common name Kellogg's dwarf rush.

It is native to western North America from British Columbia to California, where it grows in low, wet spots in meadows and other grassy areas, for example, vernal pools.

Description
Juncus kelloggii is a tiny annual herb forming small, dense clumps of hairlike reddish stems no more than a few centimeters tall. The stems are surrounded by a few thready leaves.

The inflorescence is a cluster of approximately three flowers atop the small stems. Each flower is made up of a few reddish segments just 2 or 3 millimeters long curved around the developing fruit.

External links
Jepson Manual Treatment
Photo gallery

kelloggii
Flora of the West Coast of the United States
Flora of British Columbia
Flora of California
Natural history of the California Coast Ranges
Plants described in 1868
Flora without expected TNC conservation status